Hypatopa nigrostriata is a moth in the family Blastobasidae. It is found in the United States, including Arizona and California.

The wingspan is about 13 mm. The forewings are white, sprinkled and striated with blackish scales. The hindwings are shining, pale brownish gray.

References

Moths described in 1907
Hypatopa